Arctic Canadian Diamond Company (formerly known as Dominion Diamond Mines, Dominion Diamond Corporation, Harry Winston, and Aber) is a Canadian specialist diamond mining company. Aside from its corporate office in Calgary, Arctic Canadian also has cleaning and sorting facilities in Yellowknife and Mumbai and a marketing office in Antwerp, Belgium.

The company once held a 40% stake in the Diavik Diamond Mine Project. Production at the Diavik Diamond Mine, Canada's second diamond mine, is operated by Dominion Diamond Mines' joint venture partner, Diavik Diamond Mine, a subsidiary of Rio Tinto. The mine began producing diamonds in November 2002.

In 2012, the company purchased all of BHP's diamond assets; the primary asset is the Ekati Diamond Mine, which is adjacent to the Diavik Mine.

Diavik and Ekati combined are estimated to produce over 7 million carats of diamonds in 2014, worth an estimated $1.1 billion. Diavik and Ekati are currently ranked the 9th and 19th largest diamond mines in the world, respectively, according to total carat production.

The company's participation in the retail segment of the diamond pipeline was by means of its ownership of Harry Winston, Inc., a chain of retail stores. On January 14, 2013 the company announced that it has entered into an agreement to sell its luxury brand diamond jewelry and timepiece division, Harry Winston Inc., to the Swatch Group for US$750 million plus their assumption of up to US$250 million of pro forma net debt. The transaction included the brand and all the activities related to jewelry and watches, including the 535 employees worldwide and the production company in Geneva (Switzerland).

In March 2017, Dominion Diamond announced it had received an unsolicited and non-binding expression of interest from The Washington Companies to acquire the company for US$1.1 billion.
  In July 2017, Dominion announced that it would accept the deal, which closed in November.

In June 2017, a deal was signed with online diamond retailer James Allen to make it the exclusive online retailer of CanadaMark diamonds.

In October, 2018 a 552-carat yellow diamond was discovered at the Diavik Diamond Mine in Canada's Northwest Territories.

By June 2020, the company was close to collapse because sales had stalled so severely during the COVID-19 pandemic. Debt had increased to US$1.2 billion. Since the company would be unable to pay that debt, it was in the process of restructuring through the courts to avoid bankruptcy.

In February 2021, Dominion Diamond Mines sold the Ekati Mine, and all its assets, excluding its stake in the Diavik Diamond Mine to a new company named Arctic Canadian Diamond Company, which is made up of a consortium capital funds.

See also
 Diamonds as an investment

References

External links
 

Mining companies of Canada
Diamond mining companies
Companies based in Toronto
Companies formerly listed on the Toronto Stock Exchange
2017 mergers and acquisitions